Golden Jubilee Medal (Bengali: সুবর্ণ জয়ন্তী পদক), is a military medal of Bangladesh. The medal was established in 1998 in honor of the 50th anniversary of the creation of the East Bengal Regiment. At the moment, the East Bengal Regiment consists of 50 battalions and plays a key role in ensuring the sovereignty of the independent state of Bangladesh.

References 

Military awards and decorations of Bangladesh